The 2019 Indiana Hoosiers baseball team were a college baseball team that represented Indiana University in the 2019 NCAA Division I baseball season. The Hoosiers are members of the Big Ten Conference (B1G) and play their home games at Bart Kaufman Field in Bloomington, Indiana. They were led by first-year head coach Jeff Mercer.

Previous season
The Hoosiers finished the 2018 NCAA Division I baseball season 40–19 overall (14–9 conference) and fifth place in conference standings. Following the conclusion of the regular season, the Hoosiers were selected to play in the 2018 NCAA Tournament, beginning in the Austin Regional. The Hoosiers would eventually lose in the final round of the Austin Regional to Texas by a score of 2–3.

MLB draft 
The following Hoosiers on the 2018 roster were selected in the 2018 Major League Baseball draft:

* indicates draftee had no more college eligibility

Preseason
On June 25, 2018, Mississippi State confirmed that it had hired Chris Lemonis as their new head baseball coach, formally ending Lemonis' tenure with the Hoosiers. Lemonis compiled a 141–91–2 overall record, 55–37-1 conference record and three NCAA Tournament appearances, while head coach of the Hoosiers.

On July 2, 2018, Indiana University Athletics announced the hiring of former Wright State head coach Jeff Mercer, to the head coaching position for the Hoosiers.

On July 18, 2018, Mercer made a notable acquisition to the Hoosiers' coaching staff with the hiring of former-MLB third baseman Scott Rolen as Director of Player Development.

Season projections
Coming off of an NCAA Regional appearance in 2018, the 2019 Hoosiers were projected to finish fourth in conference play by B1G coaches; however, other media outlets predicted the Hoosiers would finish as high as first in the B1G. The Hoosiers were ranked or received votes for rankings in two of the six major preseason polls and rankings. Indiana was ranked #37 in the NCBWA poll and received votes for ranking by Collegiate Baseball.

Roster

Schedule

! style="" | Regular Season
|- valign="top" 

|- align="center" bgcolor="#bbbbbb"
|  || February 15 || at  || || FedExPark • Memphis, Tennessee, || Postponed || – 
| -|| –
|- align="center" bgcolor="#ccffcc"
| 1 ||  || at Memphis || || FedExPark • Memphis, Tennessee || 6–1 || 1–0 
|374|| –
|- align="center" bgcolor="#ffcccc"
| 2 ||  || at Memphis || || FedExPark • Memphis, Tennessee || 3–6 || 1–1 
|391|| –
|- align="center" bgcolor="#ccffcc"
| 3 || February 17 || at Memphis || || FedExPark • Memphis, Tennessee || 6–0 || 2–1 
|407|| –
|- align="center" bgcolor="#ffcccc"
| 4 || February 22 || at Tennessee || || Lindsey Nelson Stadium • Knoxville, Tennessee, || 1–5 || 2–2 
|1,068|| –
|- align="center" bgcolor="#ffcccc"
| 5 || February 23 || at Tennessee || || Lindsey Nelson Stadium • Knoxville, Tennessee || 0–11 || 2–3 
|981|| –
|- align="center" bgcolor="#ffcccc"
| 6 || February 24 || at Tennessee || || Lindsey Nelson Stadium • Knoxville, Tennessee || 3–5 || 2–4 
|1,767|| –
|- align="center" bgcolor="#ccffcc"
| 7 || February 26 ||  || || Bart Kaufman Field • Bloomington, Indiana || 7–1 || 3–4 
|1,171|| –
|- align="center" bgcolor="#ccffcc"
| 8 || February 27 ||  || || Bart Kaufman Field • Bloomington, Indiana || 9–3 || 4–4 
|1,087|| –
|-

|- align="center" bgcolor="#bbbbbb"
| || March 1 || vs  || || Conway, South Carolina(Coastal Carolina Tournament) || Postponed || – 
| || –
|- align="center" bgcolor="#ccffcc"
| 9 || || vs  || || Conway, South Carolina(Coastal Carolina Tournament) || 6–4 || 5–4 
|205|| –
|- align="center" bgcolor="#ccffcc"
| 10 ||  || vs Connecticut || || Conway, South Carolina(Coastal Carolina Tournament) || 9–6 || 6–4 
|275|| –
|- align="center" bgcolor="#ffcccc"
| 11 || March 3 || vs No. 11 Coastal Carolina || || Conway, South Carolina(Coastal Carolina Tournament) || 5–6 || 6–5 
|1,613|| –
|- align="center" bgcolor="#bbbbbb"
| 12 || March 5 || Indiana State || || Bart Kaufman Field • Bloomington, Indiana || Postponed || – 
| || –
|- align="center" bgcolor="#ccffcc"
| 13 || March 8 || vs No. 29  || || T-Mobile Park • Seattle, Washington(Safeco Field Tournament)|| 1–0 || 7–5 
|1,250|| –
|- align="center" bgcolor="#ffcccc"
| 14 || March 9 || vs No. 3 Oregon State || || T-Mobile Park • Seattle, Washington(Safeco Field Tournament)|| 3–8 || 7–6 
|3,000|| –
|- align="center" bgcolor="#ffcccc"
| 15 || March 10 || vs  || || T-Mobile Park • Seattle, Washington(Safeco Field Tournament)|| 3–5 || 7–7 
|750|| –
|- align="center" bgcolor="#ffcccc"
| 16 || March 13 || at  || || Marge Schott Stadium • Cincinnati, Ohio, || 5–7 || 7–8 
|1,063|| –
|- align="center" bgcolor="#ccffcc"
| 17 || March 15 ||  || || Bart Kaufman Field • Bloomington, Indiana || 18–6 || 8–8 
|1,291|| –
|- align="center" bgcolor="#ccffcc"
| 18 ||  || Canisius || || Bart Kaufman Field • Bloomington, Indiana || 5–2 || 9–8 
|1,501|| –
|- align="center" bgcolor="#ccffcc"
| 19 ||  || Canisius || || Bart Kaufman Field • Bloomington, Indiana || 16–5 || 10–8 
|1,501|| –
|- align="center" bgcolor="#ccffcc"
| 20 || March 17 || Canisius || || Bart Kaufman Field • Bloomington, Indiana || 12–1 || 11–8 
|1,395|| –
|- align="center" bgcolor="#ccffcc"
| 21 || March 19 || at Indiana State || || Bob Warn Field at Sycamore Stadium • Terre Haute, Indiana || 15–14 || 12–8 
|1,108|| –
|- align="center" bgcolor="#ccffcc"
| 22 || March 22 ||  || || Bart Kaufman Field • Bloomington, Indiana || 3–2 || 13–8 
|1,942|| 1–0
|- align="center" bgcolor="#ccffcc"
| 23 || March 23 || Iowa || || Bart Kaufman Field • Bloomington, Indiana || 13–1 || 14–8 
|2,271|| 2–0
|- align="center" bgcolor="#ccffcc"
| 24 || March 24 || Iowa || || Bart Kaufman Field • Bloomington, Indiana || 7–1 || 15–8 
|1,366|| 3–0
|- align="center" bgcolor="#ffcccc"
| 25 || March 27 ||  || || Bart Kaufman Field • Bloomington, Indiana || 8–9 || 15–9 
|1,827|| 3–0
|- align="center" bgcolor="#ffcccc"
| 26 || March 29 || at Maryland || || Shipley Field • College Park, Maryland || 0–2 || 15–10 
|571|| 3–1
|- align="center" bgcolor="#ccffcc"
| 27 || March 30 || at Maryland || || Shipley Field • College Park, Maryland || 20–5 || 16–10 
|899|| 4–1
|- align="center" bgcolor="#ccffcc"
| 28 || March 31 || at Maryland || || Shipley Field • College Park, Maryland || 19–4 || 17–10 
|534|| 5–1
|-

|- align="center" bgcolor="#ffcccc"
| 29 || April 3 ||  || || Bart Kaufman Field • Bloomington, Indiana  || 4–15 || 17–11 
|1,528|| 5–1
|- align="center" bgcolor="#ffcccc"
| 30 || April 5 ||  || || Bart Kaufman Field • Bloomington, Indiana || 0–3 || 17–12 
|1,784|| 5–2
|- align="center" bgcolor="#ccffcc"
| 31 ||  || Penn State || || Bart Kaufman Field • Bloomington, Indiana || 5–3 || 18–12 
|2,969|| 6–2
|- align="center" bgcolor="#ccffcc"
| 32 ||  || Penn State || || Bart Kaufman Field • Bloomington, Indiana || 3–2 || 19–12 
|2,969|| 7–2
|- align="center" bgcolor="#ccffcc"
| 33 || April 10 || Purdue || || Bart Kaufman Field • Bloomington, Indiana || 7–6 || 20–12 
|2,664|| 7–2
|- align="center" bgcolor="#ccffcc"
| 34 || April 12 || at  || || Charles H. Braun Stadium • Evansville, Indiana || 5–0 || 21–12 
|1,367|| 7–2
|- align="center" bgcolor="#ccffcc"
| 35 ||  || Evansville || || Bart Kaufman Field • Bloomington, Indiana || 5–1 || 22–12 
|1,921|| 7–2
|- align="center" bgcolor="#ccffcc"
| 36 ||  || Evansville || || Bart Kaufman Field • Bloomington, Indiana || 9–3 || 23–12 
|1,921|| 7–2
|- align="center" bgcolor="#ccffcc"
| 37 || April 14 || Evansville || || Bart Kaufman Field • Bloomington, Indiana || 6–5 || 24–12 
|2,197|| 7–2
|- align="center" bgcolor="#ccffcc"
| 38 || April 16 ||  || || Bart Kaufman Field • Bloomington, Indiana || 14–3 || 25–12 
|1,960|| 7–2
|- align="center" bgcolor="#ccffcc"
| 39 || April 19 || at  || || Drayton McLane Baseball Stadium at John H. Kobs Field • East Lansing, Michigan, || 13–4 || 26–12 
|1,416|| 8–2
|- align="center" bgcolor="#ffcccc"
| 40 || April 20 || at Michigan State || || Drayton McLane Baseball Stadium at John H. Kobs Field • East Lansing, Michigan || 3–5 || 26–13 
|1,836|| 8–3
|- align="center" bgcolor="#ccffcc"
| 41 || April 21 || at Michigan State || || Drayton McLane Baseball Stadium at John H. Kobs Field • East Lansing, Michigan || 11–2 || 27–13 
|1,836|| 9–3
|- align="center" bgcolor="#ccffcc"
| 42 || April 23 || vs Ball State|| No. 24 || Victory Field • Indianapolis, Indiana || 9–3 || 28–13 
|2,441|| 9–3
|- align="center" bgcolor="#ffcccc"
| 43 || April 26 ||  || No. 24 || Bart Kaufman Field • Bloomington, Indiana || 3–7 || 28–14 
|2,386|| 9–4
|- align="center" bgcolor="#ccffcc"
| 44 || April 27 || Minnesota || No. 24 || Bart Kaufman Field • Bloomington, Indiana || 7–6 || 29–14 
|1,888|| 10–4
|- align="center" bgcolor="#ccffcc"
| 45 || April 28 || Minnesota || No. 24 || Bart Kaufman Field • Bloomington, Indiana || 7–1 || 30–14 
|2,096|| 11–4
|-

|- align="center" bgcolor="#ffcccc"
| 46 || May 3 || at  || No. 23 || Illinois Field • Champaign, Illinois, || 0–4 || 30–15 
|2,379|| 11–5
|- align="center" bgcolor="#ffcccc"
| 47 || May 4 || at Illinois || No. 23 || Illinois Field • Champaign, Illinois || 1–3 || 30–16 
|2,779|| 11–6
|- align="center" bgcolor="#ccffcc"
| 48 || May 5 || at Illinois || No. 23 || Illinois Field • Champaign, Illinois || 9–2 || 31–16 
|2,118|| 12–6
|- align="center" bgcolor="#ffcccc"
| 49 || May 7 || at Kentucky || No. 25 || Cliff Hagan Stadium • Lexington, Kentucky, || 2–5 || 31–17 
|3,162|| 12–6
|- align="center" bgcolor="#ccffcc"
| 50 || May 10 || at Michigan || No. 25 || Ray Fisher Stadium • Ann Arbor, Michigan, || 10–4 || 32–17 
|1,418|| 13–6
|- align="center" bgcolor="#ccffcc"
| 51 || May 11 || at Michigan || No. 25 || Ray Fisher Stadium • Ann Arbor, Michigan || 10–8 || 33–17 
|1,540|| 14–6
|- align="center" bgcolor="#ffcccc"
| 52 || May 12 || at Michigan || No. 25 || Ray Fisher Stadium • Ann Arbor, Michigan || 5–6 || 33–18 
|945|| 14–7
|- align="center" bgcolor="#ffcccc"
| 53 || May 14 || Louisville || No. 21 || Bart Kaufman Field • Bloomington, Indiana || 7–8 || 33–19 
|2,622|| 14–7
|- align="center" bgcolor="#ccffcc"
| 54 || May 16 ||  || No. 21 || Bart Kaufman Field • Bloomington, Indiana || 7–5 || 34–19 
|1,829|| 15–7
|- align="center" bgcolor="#ccffcc"
| 55 || May 17 || Rutgers || No. 21 || Bart Kaufman Field • Bloomington, Indiana || 11–4 || 35–19 
|2,690|| 16–7
|- align="center" bgcolor="#ccffcc"
| 56 || May 18 || Rutgers || No. 21 || Bart Kaufman Field • Bloomington, Indiana || 13–3 || 36–19 
|2,673|| 17–7
|-

|-
! style="" | Post-Season
|- 

|- align="center" bgcolor="#ffcccc"
| 57 || May 22 || Iowa || TD Ameritrade Park • Omaha, Nebraska, || 2–4 || 36–20 || 17–7
|- align="center" bgcolor="#ffcccc"
| 58 || May 23 || Minnesota || TD Ameritrade Park • Omaha, Nebraska || 4–9 || 36–21 || 17–7
|-

|- align="center" bgcolor="#ffcccc"
| 59 || May 31 || Illinois State || Jim Patterson Stadium • Louisville, Kentucky, || 7–8 
|1,227|| 36–22
|- align="center" bgcolor="#ccffcc"
| 60 || June 1 ||  || Jim Patterson Stadium • Louisville, Kentucky || 9–5 
|758|| 37–22
|- align="center" bgcolor="#ffcccc"
| 60 || June 2 || Louisville || Jim Patterson Stadium • Louisville, Kentucky || 7–9 
|2,339|| 37–23
|-

|-
| style="font-size:88%" | "#" represents ranking. All rankings from Collegiate Baseball on the date of the contest."()" represents postseason seeding in the Big 10 Tournament or NCAA Regional, respectively.
|-
| Schedule Source

Louisville Regional

Ranking movements

Awards and honors

Pre-season awards / Watch list

Regular season awards / Watch lists

Conference awards

Award watch lists
Listed in the order that they were released

See also
 2019 Big Ten Conference baseball tournament
 2019 NCAA Division I baseball tournament

References

Indiana
Indiana Hoosiers baseball seasons
Indiana
Indiana
Big Ten Conference baseball champion seasons